Ed Reardon's Week is a sitcom on BBC Radio 4 recorded semi-naturalistically in the style of a radio drama. It concerns the story of a curmudgeonly middle-aged writer described in the show's publicity material as an "author, pipesmoker, consummate fare-dodger and master of the abusive email". The names of two central characters, Ed Reardon (played by Christopher Douglas) and Jaz Milvane (played by Philip Jackson), are references to the characters Edwin Reardon and Jasper Milvain, who appear in George Gissing's 1891 novel New Grub Street, which is set in the hack-literary London of the late 19th century, although Edward was revealed to be his given name in the second episode of the third series and Milvain is referred to as Jaz Milvane.

Ed lives in precarious circumstances with his cat, Elgar, scraping a living as a hack writer by working through commissions for coffee table books such as The Brands Hatch Story and Pet Peeves, a book of celebrity pet anecdotes. Much of this work comes through his agent Felix (John Fortune), who Ed believes still owes him royalties, and Felix's assistant Ping - shortened from 'Pandora Ingleby-Thomas' (Sally Hawkins in series 1, 3, and 4, and Barunka O'Shaughnessy in the second series and the fifth series onwards) – an archetypal Sloane Ranger who rejects the amorous advances he makes occasionally in early episodes. The character of Felix was written out in Series 7 as John Fortune died in 2013.

He makes a small income from running a creative writing course at the local night school, where his lessons frequently mention the single episode of Tenko that he wrote. Ed also earns an occasional £10 fee for taking part in identity parades at his local police station. He is an alumnus of Shrewsbury School. The programme contains many references to Berkhamsted, Hertfordshire, where Ed lives.

The theme music is a dixieland version of "Am I Blue?" It was recorded at the 606 Club in London, performed by session musicians present.

The series is written by Chris Douglas and Andrew Nickolds, and produced by Simon Nicholls (first three series) and Dawn Ellis (fourth series onwards).

Origins of the character of Ed
Speaking on Pick of the Week
 Christopher Douglas explained where Ed's character came from: "Simon Gray's published diaries were mainly about how badly treated he'd been by producers, actors, critics and electronic machinery. His impotent rage against his employers was one of the inspirations for Ed Reardon, the character I co-write, perform and in some ways resemble. Ed often rants from the point of view of appalled gentleman author, but he can also play the thwarted radical."

Ed's literary background
Ed considers himself a serious writer but there is little evidence to support his view of himself. His only novel, Who Would Fardels Bear?, was published in the 1970s, and was adapted into a film (Sister Mom) by Ed's friend, Jaz Milvane (played by Philip Jackson). Because the setting was moved from Oldham to California and the lead role was taken by Sally Field, the film's faithfulness to the novel is in doubt. Milvane is a successful British Hollywood film director in the mould of Tony Scott or Adrian Lyne. Ed's only other screen credit is a 1982 episode of the BBC wartime drama, Tenko ("Escape from the Bamboo Noose") and, based on the evidence provided in the drama so far, this may well be his only other non-coffee table book project. During his early career, Ed also wrote various stage plays, all of which seem to have been both unfortunately timed and titled, bearing striking (yet apparently accidental) resemblances to works by Willy Russell and Mike Leigh. An early amateur film made with Jaz Milvane, "The 4th Sausage" (an allusion to European New Year staple, Dinner for One), is the focus of Episode 6, Series 11.

Ed's books
 Who Would Fardels Bear?
 Came She With Fantastic Garlands (Lost)
 Jane Seymour's Household Hints
 The Brands Hatch Story
 34 At The Last Count - The Unofficial Prime Suspect Book
 Pet Peeves (publisher: Sow's Ear)
 Nigel Mansell's Love Poetry
 Pet Peeves 2
 Postal Panoply (publisher: Septred Isle )
 Shed 22lb in a Week the Vanessa Feltz Way
 Armando Iannucci's Carpathian Walks
 John Kettley's Big Book of Weather
 Kevin Pietersen's Big BBQ Book
 A Taste of Paraquat, The Reigate Poisoner Autobiography
 The Stig's big book of Speed Cameras  (Series 7, Episode 5 & Series 11, Episode 1)
 It's Been Emotional (uncredited ghost-written autobiography of Vinnie Jones, publ Sep 2013)
 It's Been a Roller Coaster (Ghost-written autobiography of the Archbishop of Canterbury)
 Modernists Roadtrip, Antiques, and the story of discovery, potholes and loss
 Desert Orchid's autobiography
 I, Cheggars (ghost-written autobiography of Keith Chegwin (Season 14, episode 1))

Ed's radio work
 The Amazing True Story Of The South Tring Bubble
 The South Tring Bubble (Reworking of the above for Hemel Sound)
 Cheese Cricket (Pilot for a radio panel show)

Ed's stage work
 Educating Peter (referencing  Educating Rita)
 Stanley Valentine (referencing Shirley Valentine)
 Blood Sisters (referencing  Blood Brothers)
 Alistair's Party (referencing Abigail’s Party)
 The Mouserap  musical (referencing The Mousetrap)

Ed's TV work
 Tenko
Danger Mouse
Roland Rat Christmas Special
Holby City (original treatment)
Japanese Night on BBC2 (un-aired, replaced by An Evening With Jaz Milvane)

Ed's family
Ed has a son and a daughter, Jake and Eli, who make occasional appearances. An insight into Ed as a father is given in "The Operation" (S.2 Ep.6), where Jake complains: "that's all we ever got from you... a sarcastic one-liner followed by a 'now leave me alone to sink into a drunken stupor of self-loathing."

Ed's father, Sidney, (played by David Warner) made an appearance in the episode "Dad". Appearing just as bad-tempered and impatient as Ed, Sidney demonstrated more understanding of popular culture by being familiar with the children's television programme Dick and Dom in da Bungalow. He emigrated to Australia for tax reasons with a new partner, following Ed's failed attempt to secure his inheritance.

Ed's current life
Ed teaches a screenwriting class, held weekly at the local sports centre. This adult education group spends a lot of time giving him advice and making comments about his general lack of achievement, between complaints about being forced to watch his Tenko episode endlessly (an in-joke as one of the class is played by Stephanie Cole, who had a leading role in Tenko). Ed also plays in a Dixieland jazz band called The Bayou Boys with his more successful friends, his instrument of choice being the jug. In the first episode Jaz sits in with them on trumpet, making Ed's contribution seem anaemic by comparison.

Ed has lived in a one-bedroom flat with his cat Elgar in Berkhamsted, in the borough of Dacorum, Hertfordshire, ever since he sold his London home after a messy divorce. This is described as "living at the cutting edge, or to be more accurate, "above The Cutting Edge", as he has a flat over a hairdressing salon of this name."

Ed was seen heading into surgery for coronary bypass (necessitated by his lifelong affair with "beer and baccy" and mature cheddar cheese) at the end of the second series, with Felix on the one hand, abetted by Jaz, pushing him to start on a new novel for Jaz to film ("Put plenty of cricket in it." says Felix) while Ping is urging him to commit to Pet Peeves 2, the fee for which will be needed to pay his hospital bill.

At the end of the first series (Ep. 5), a blossoming romance with a young woman of similar temperament was cruelly dashed by her allergy to cats, dander from which could be found in Ed's beard. At the end of the fourth series Ed became involved with the popular novelist Mary Potter (Sally Grace), spending several nights a week with her by the start of the fifth series, though by the end of the seventh series he had rekindled an old romance with Fiona (Jenny Agutter). By Series 12 his romantic focus had moved to his agency colleague, Maggie (Pippa Haywood).

Humour
Much humour comes from Ed's rants and inability to stop himself getting carried away in his angry tirades, often triggered by learning that somebody younger than him is proving more successful (such as the author of Eats, Shoots and Leaves, Lynne Truss; one tirade follows Ed receiving several copies of the book as gifts for his birthday and working out how much in royalties Truss will have received because of the book sales).  Underlying this however, are observations of the injustices and stupidities ("sheer asininity") of modern life.

Writers
Ed Reardon is played by actor Christopher Douglas, who also co-writes the series with Andrew Nickolds.

A spin-off book was published in November 2005.

Awards
Ed Reardon's Week has twice been voted Best Radio Programme by the Broadcasting Press Guild, at their 32nd Annual Television and Radio Awards in 2006 and at the 37th in 2011.

Critical reaction
Gillian Reynolds, writing for The Daily Telegraph, called Reardon a "sublime creation" who was becoming "a national treasure" in 2012, and in 2016 complimented Douglas's "sublime performance" that makes Ed Reardon the "supreme social commentator on our times". The Independent also praised it, saying it "crackled with great lines, without any of that telegraphing you get too often in Radio 4 comedy". Miranda Sawyer in The Guardian found Reardon brilliantly observed, but more annoying than funny.

Stage version
Christopher Douglas and Andrew Nickolds have written a stage version, Ed Reardon: A Writer's Burden, which played at the Pleasance Courtyard during the 2011 Edinburgh Fringe Festival (An Evening with Ed Reardon.) and was directed by Adrian Lloyd-James.

Episode list
Series 1 was originally broadcast on BBC Radio 4 in January and February 2005. Series 2 ran from December 2005 until January 2006, Series 3 from 15 December 2006 to 19 January 2007 and Series 4 from November 2007 to December 2007. Series 5 began weekly transmission on Radio 4 on Monday 6 October 2008 at 11:30am. Each episode is available as streaming audio over the internet, through the BBC's Listen Again service, for 30 days after broadcast.

Series 1 was repeated in August–September 2007 on BBC 7. Series 12 started airing on BBC Radio 4 in October 2017, and the latest (Series 14) began airing on Tuesday 08 June 2021 on Radio 4, repeated shortly after on Radio 4 Extra.

Series 1

Series 2

Series 3

Series 4

Series 5

Series 6

An Audience with Ed Reardon

Series 7

Series 8

Ed Reardon's Christmas Week
(50th episode)

Series 9

Series 10

Ed Reardon at Christmas

Series 11

Series 12

Series 13

Ed Reardon at Christmas

Series 14

Cast list

Ed Reardon - Christopher Douglas
Jaz Milvane - Philip Jackson
Ping (Pandora Ingleby-Thomas) - Sally Hawkins (series 1, 3 & 4): Barunka O'Shaughnessy (series 2 and 5 onwards).  Ping has a sister Py (Pyrocanthus) who appears in the Series 7 episode "Parsnip Junction", played by Katy Wix.
Felix - John Fortune Final appearance in "Writer in Residence", Series 7 prior to John Fortune's death in 2013
Olive - Stephanie Cole
Pearl - Rita May Series 1 - 8: Alison Steadman Series 9: Brigit Forsyth Series 10 onwards
Stan - Geoffrey Whitehead
Suzan - Raquel Cassidy Series 10
Fiona - Jenny Agutter Series 7 onwards
Maggie - Pippa Haywood Series 12 onwards

Notes

External links

Elgar's Litter Tray

2005 radio programme debuts
BBC Radio comedy programmes
Berkhamsted
Ed Reardon's Week